Proterodesma is a genus of moths belonging to the family Tineidae. All the species in this genus are endemic to New Zealand.

Species
 Proterodesma byrsopola Meyrick, 1909
 Proterodesma chathamica Dugdale, 1971
 Proterodesma turbotti (Salmon & Bradley, 1956)

References

Tineidae
Endemic fauna of New Zealand
Tineidae genera
Endemic moths of New Zealand